Exalcidion tetracanthum is a species of longhorn beetles of the subfamily Lamiinae. It was described by Monné and Delfino in 1981, and is known from Peru.

References

Beetles described in 1981
Endemic fauna of Peru
Acanthocinini